CICR may refer to:

 Calcium-induced calcium release
 Comité international de la Croix-Rouge, the International Committee of the Red Cross
 The Center for International Conflict Resolution
 Cumulative incidence competing risk